() is a stadium in Chiba City, Chiba, Japan. It opened in 1990 and holds approximately 30,000 people. It is primarily used for baseball and is the home field of the Chiba Lotte Marines. It is also used for Rugby union. The stadium was built in a multi-purpose circular shape, similarly shaped like now-demolished American stadiums like Three Rivers Stadium or Busch Memorial Stadium.

The official opening of the stadium was on April 13, 1990, when popstar Madonna opened her Blond Ambition Tour at the venue. The show was blighted by heavy rain and high winds which led to the concert being dramatically scaled back, as documented in her documentary Truth or Dare. She did successfully do two other shows on the 14 & 15 April.

Lady Gaga performed 2 sold-out shows at the venue on August 13 and 14, 2014, for her ArtRave: The Artpop Ball tour.

The Summer Sonic Festival is held at the stadium, as well as the Makuhari Messe, every summer. Electric Daisy Carnival Japan is also held at the stadium, with its first event beginning in 2017.

One of the stadium's most notable baseball events was on April 10, 2022, when Chiba Lotte Marines pitcher Rōki Sasaki threw a perfect game, the 16th perfect game in NPB history. Four more no-hitters, aside from the perfect game, would be thrown that season.

Gallery

Trivia
The stadium was modelled as a stage in the 1994 video game Tekken, although it was only known as "Stadium".

References

Nippon Professional Baseball venues
Rugby union stadiums in Japan
Chiba Lotte Marines
Sports venues in Chiba (city)
Sports venues completed in 1990
1990 establishments in Japan